Adixoa is a genus of moths in the family Sesiidae.

Species
Adixoa alterna (Walker, [1865])
Adixoa leucocyanea (Zukowsky, 1929)
Adixoa tomentosa Schultze, 1908
Adixoa trizonata (Hampson, 1900)

References

Sesiidae